Alexandra Irena Acevedo Joner (born 25 March 1990), professionally known as Alexandra Joner, is a Norwegian singer and dancer. She is the daughter of Norwegian musician and composer Sverre Indris Joner and a Cuban mother Barbara Joner. She additionally is the niece of actor Johannes Joner and cousin of actors Knut Joner and Kristoffer Joner.

Joner debuted with her single "Sunrise", released in Norway on 4 May 2012 via production team ELEMENT/MindCode Records and Universal Music Norway. The song reached number one on the sales chart for Platekompaniet, and peaked at number eight on the Norwegian Singles Chart. The song features vocals from Madcon. In 2007, Joner was a contestant on the Norwegian version of So You Think You Can Dance called Dansefeber.

Music career

2012-present: debut single
Joner debuted with her single "Sunrise", released in Norway on 4 May 2012 via production team ELEMENT/MindCode Records and Universal Music Norway. The song reached number one on the sales chart for Platekompaniet, and peaked at number eight on the Norwegian Singles Chart. The song reached triple platinum status. The song features vocals from Norwegian dance/hip hop duo, Madcon.

Joner was announced as a contestant in Melodi Grand Prix 2022 with the song "Hasta la vista" on 10th January 2022.

Discography

Singles

References

1990 births
21st-century Norwegian singers
21st-century Norwegian women singers
Dansefeber contestants
English-language singers from Norway
Living people
Norwegian female dancers
Norwegian women singers
Norwegian people of Cuban descent
Norwegian pop singers